The 1999 Mr. Olympia contest was an IFBB professional bodybuilding competition held October 21–24, 1999 at the Mandalay Bay Arena in Las Vegas, Nevada.

Results
The total prize money awarded was $311,000.

Notable events
Ronnie Coleman won his second consecutive Mr. Olympia title.
Markus Rühl placed positive for diuretics and was disqualified.
Porter Cottrell withdrew from the contest due to a firefighting accident that occurred a few weeks earlier.

See also
 1999 Ms. Olympia

References

External links 
 Mr. Olympia
 1999 Olympia Weekend coverage

 1999
1999 in American sports
Mr. Olympia 1999
1999 in bodybuilding